The Paul Bishop's House is actually a pair of historic townhouses located at 363-365 Adelaide Street East in the St. Lawrence neighborhood downtown Toronto, Ontario, Canada.  The houses, constructed in 1848 by Paul Bishop, sit upon the foundations laid by William Jarvis for his home in 1798.  Jarvis was a member of the Queen's Rifles and Provincial Secretary and Registrar of Upper Canada.  He selected a site at what is now the southeast corner of Sherbourne and Adelaide Streets and constructed a 30 by 41 foot building of squared logs that he covered with clapboards which he named Jarvis House.

After William's death in 1817, his son Samuel divided the two acres of land on which the house sat into smaller parcels and sold them.  The house went through a series of owners and was expanded in the early 1820s.

During the Cholera epidemics in the 1830s, several people who lived in a rooming house now occupying Jarvis House died. To prevent the disease from spreading, owner James Kidd sealed several of their rooms. After the deaths in the house it gained a reputation in the city as being haunted.  During Mr. Kidd's occupancy of the home it was said that on several occasions unearthly noises were heard in the room Secretary Jarvis used as an office.  This drove Mr. Kidd out of the house and it remained vacant for a few years.

In 1841, James Kidd sold the house to Paul Bishop, a blacksmith who worked in an adjacent building.  In his workshop in 1837, Bishop created Toronto's first horse-drawn cab based on a design presented to him by Thornton Blackburn.  Blackburn operated his taxi business until 1860 and left a considerable fortune upon his death in 1890.  His cabs were painted yellow and red, the colors now used by the Toronto Transit Commission.

In 1848, Bishop demolished the old house and built the current structure.  They consist of two-storey brick houses in the Georgian style with a stone-clad cellar partially above ground.  The north facade of each house contained three symmetrical bays with stone lintels and sills framing the windows  The houses survived the Great Fire of Toronto of 1849 and in 1860, came under the ownership of Thomas Dennie Harris.

Harris died in 1872 and the property again underwent a series of changes.  Nearby trees were removed and the small yard around the house was torn-up.  The interior was gutted and during the next hundred years, the building served as a machine shop, garage and rooming house at various times.  Windows were closed and new doors cut through the exterior walls.

According to John Ross Robertson's Landmarks of Toronto (Volume I, 130–132), blacksmith Paul Bishop acquired the property on the corner of Duke (Adelaide) and Caroline (Sherbourne) Streets formerly belonging to Sheriff Jarvis where he erected the subject buildings in 1848. However, historical records indicate that Bishop actually acquired the subject property in 1841, with the house form buildings in place the following year. An 1842 Map of Toronto, which shows the site as developed, also supports this date. Robertson describes Bishop as a French Canadian blacksmith and wheelwright who "was the principal workman in his trade in the town, but eventually he failed in business and left Toronto". Initially renting the property, Bishop resided on-site in 1843. The next year, he sold the property to Malachy O'Donohue, a local landowner. O'Donohue retained the site until 1846.

Today 

The Bishop Houses were declared a historic property through Toronto By-law 895-1998 enacted on December 17, 1998, under the Ontario Heritage Act.  At the time, the building had been vacant for an extended time and still bore the alterations made since 1872. These included a three-storey addition to the rear and addition of a gabled dormer on the roof.  The houses were restored in 2005-2006 and the addition removed to allow construction of the highrise Kings Court Condominium building to the south.

See also 
 List of oldest buildings and structures in Toronto

References 

Houses in Toronto
Georgian architecture in Canada
Houses completed in 1848